Omar Turro is a paralympic athlete from Cuba competing mainly in category T12 sprint events.

Omar competed in two paralympic games, his first in 1992 led to a gold medal in the 400m, silver medal in the 100m and bronze in the 200m.  His second games came twelve years later in 2004 where he competed in the 200m and 400m but was unable to make the final in either event.

References

Paralympic athletes of Cuba
Athletes (track and field) at the 1992 Summer Paralympics
Athletes (track and field) at the 2004 Summer Paralympics
Paralympic gold medalists for Cuba
Paralympic silver medalists for Cuba
Paralympic bronze medalists for Cuba
Living people
Medalists at the 1992 Summer Paralympics
Year of birth missing (living people)
Place of birth missing (living people)
Paralympic medalists in athletics (track and field)
Cuban male sprinters
Visually impaired sprinters
Paralympic sprinters
20th-century Cuban people